Live This Life is a 2005 album by South African rock band Prime Circle. The album spawned hits such as "Live This Life", "Miracle", and "Maybe Wrong".

Track listing
"Live This Life" –3:38      
"Miracle" –3:11   
"The Way It Could Be" –3:29     
"Take Me Up" –3:46   
"I Don't Know" –2:55      
"Bring Me Down" –3:45     
"Miss You" –3:55      
"Always Surrounded" –4:09     
"Maybe Wrong" –4:01     
"Run Away" –3:18      
"Fall Too Fast" –4:09     
"Can't Stop the Rain" –3:42
"New Phase" –4:24

Living in a Crazy World DVD 

In 2007, a CD/DVD compilation was released containing tracks and videos from Hello Crazy World and Live This Life.

Prime Circle albums
2005 albums